Nebria tenella megrelica is a subspecies of ground beetle in the Nebriinae subfamily that is endemic to Georgia.

References

tenella megrelica
Beetles described in 1983
Beetles of Europe
Endemic fauna of Georgia (country)